Alex Willian Costa e Silva (born 18 March 1988 in Piquete, São Paulo), known as Alex Willian,  rei das flexcas,Forrest Gump,is a Brazilian footballer who plays as an attacking midfielder.

Career 
Alex Willian made his professional debut for Santos in the Campeonato Paulista against Bragantino on 27 January 2008.

Mumbai FC
He signed for Mumbai FC in February 2017. He made his debut against  Mohun Bagan in the league  at the Cooperage

Honours 
 São Paulo State Championship (U 20): 2007

References

External links 
 CBF
  santos.globo.com

1988 births
Living people
Footballers from São Paulo (state)
Brazilian footballers
Association football midfielders
Campeonato Brasileiro Série A players
Campeonato Brasileiro Série B players
Campeonato Brasileiro Série C players
Campeonato Brasileiro Série D players
Santos FC players
Clube Atlético Bragantino players
Club Athletico Paranaense players
Botafogo Futebol Clube (SP) players
Guarani FC players
Oeste Futebol Clube players
Paysandu Sport Club players
Red Bull Brasil players
Clube Atlético Sorocaba players
Associação Desportiva Recreativa e Cultural Icasa players
Clube de Regatas Brasil players
Cuiabá Esporte Clube players
KF Tirana players
Brazilian expatriate footballers
Brazilian expatriate sportspeople in Albania
Expatriate footballers in Albania